Charles Marion Russell is a sculpture depicting the American artist of the same name by John Weaver.

One version, a bronze, is installed in the United States Capitol's National Statuary Hall, in Washington, D.C., as part of the National Statuary Hall Collection. The statue was gifted by the U.S. state of Montana in 1959.

Another version is installed in the Montana Historical Society's MacKay Collection, in Helena, Montana.

References

External links

 

1959 establishments in Washington, D.C.
Marble sculptures in Washington, D.C.
Monuments and memorials in Montana
Monuments and memorials in Washington, D.C.
Russell, Charles Marion
Sculptures of men in Montana
Sculptures of men in Washington, D.C.
Statues in Montana
Charles Marion Russell